Olof August Andreas Jernberg (23 May 1855, Düsseldorf - 15 February 1935, Berlin) was a German landscape and marine painter of Swedish ancestry; associated with the Düsseldorfer Malerschule.

Life and work 
His father was the Swedish genre painter, August Jernberg. After completing his secondary education, he studied at the Kunstakademie Düsseldorf from 1875 to 1876. His primary instructors were Andreas Müller and Heinrich Lauenstein. Later, he worked with Karl Müller, and became a private student of Eugen Dücker, with whom he studied landscape painting until 1879.

From 1880 to 1881, he was in France, where he occasionally sought advice from the Swedish painter, Hugo Salmson. He also came under the influence of the Barbizon school, especially the works of Jean-François Millet and Théodore Rousseau, and developed a preference for painting en plein air. This was followed by others travels, notably to Sweden, and he was a frequent guest at the artists' colony in Katwijk.

When he returned to Düsseldorf, he worked as an assistant to Dücker at the Kunstakademie; a position he held until 1898. One of their goals was to combine the stylistic approaches of the Barbizon and Hague schools with the aesthetics of Impressionism. Two years later, the Lucas Club was subordinated to the new . In 1899, a new "St. Lucas Club" was founded by Liesegang and the other founders of the original Club, with the addition of August Deusser, Otto Heichert and Gustav Wendling. Until 1897, he was also a member of the progressive artists' association "Malkasten" (Paintbox).

In 1898, he was awarded the title of Professor and, in 1901, appointed to the Kunstakademie Königsberg. From 1918 until his death, he taught landscape painting at the Prussian Academy of Arts.

References

Further reading 
 "Jernberg, Olof August Andreas". In: Friedrich von Boetticher, Malerwerke des neunzehnten Jahrhunderts. Beitrag zur Kunstgeschichte, Dresden 1891, Vol.1, pg.614 (Online)
 Wend von Kalnein: Die Düsseldorfer Malerschule. Verlag Philipp von Zabern, Mainz 1979, pg.359 
 Bettina Baumgärtel (Ed.): Die Düsseldorfer Malerschule und ihre internationale Ausstrahlung 1819–1918. Michael Imhof Verlag, Petersberg 2011, 
 "Jernberg, Olof (August Andreas), Maler". In: Rudolf Vierhaus (Ed.): Deutsche Biographische Enzyklopädie. 2nd Ed., K. G. Saur Verlag, München 2006, pg.341 (Google Books)
 "Olof August Anders Jernberg". In: Theodor Westrin (Ed.): Nordisk familjebok ''. 2nd Ed., Vol.12: Hyperemi–Johan. Stockholm 1910 (Online @ Projekt Runeberg)

External links 

 Brief biography @ the Schwarz Gallery
 More works by Jernberg @ ArtNet

1855 births
1935 deaths
19th-century German painters
19th-century German male artists
German landscape painters
German marine artists
Kunstakademie Düsseldorf alumni
Academic staff of the Prussian Academy of Arts
Artists from Düsseldorf
German people of Swedish descent
20th-century German painters
20th-century German male artists